Bedtime with Rosie is a 1975 British comedy-drama film directed by Wolf Rilla and starring Una Stubbs, Ivor Burgoyne and Diana Dors. The onscreen title is simply Rosie, and the title song was performed by singer Danny Street.

Premise
Rosie, a highly imaginative and pregnant single woman on her way from Liverpool to Holland, stays overnight with her Aunt Annie at her dingy London home. While there she is forced to share a bed with her aunt's lodger Harry, a reclusive and disillusioned bachelor, who initially disapproves of her lifestyle. Eventually Rosie and Harry strike up a relationship after she admits to being molested as a child and that her pregnancy is the result of rape by her boyfriend.

Cast
 Una Stubbs ...  Rosie 
 Ivor Burgoyne ...  Harry 
 Diana Dors ...  Annie 
 Johnny Briggs ...  The Man 
 Margaret Heald ...  The Girl
 Tony Doonan ...  The Drunk
 Nicky Henson ...  Fantasy Man (uncredited)

References

External links
 

1975 films
1970s English-language films
Films directed by Wolf Rilla
British comedy-drama films
1975 comedy-drama films
1970s British films
English-language comedy-drama films